The following is an episode list of the Food Network series, Ace of Cakes.

Series overview

Episodes

Season 1 (2006)

Season 2 (2007)

Season 3 (2007)

Season 4 (2008)

Season 5 (2008)

Season 6 (2009)

Season 7 (2009)

Season 8 (2010)

Season 9 (2010)

Season 10 (2011)

References

External links 
 
Ace of Cakes official website at Food Network
 

Ace of Cakes